The 4th Logistics Battalion is a logistics battalion in the Land Component of the Belgian Armed Forces.

The battalion has played a role in NATO Enhanced Forward Presence in Lithuania.

In May 2020, during the COVID-19 epidemic in Belgium, the battalion was deployed to stock and distribute medical supplies, including personal protective equipment.

References

External links
 Official website

Logistics Battalion, 4
Military logistics of Belgium
Marche-en-Famenne